Iosif Naghi (20 November 1946 – 20 March 2018) was a Romanian athlete. He competed in the men's discus throw at the 1976 Summer Olympics and the 1980 Summer Olympics. He retired at the age of 38 years and died in his hometown Târgu Mureș on 20 March 2018 from a myocardial infarction.

References

External links
 

1946 births
2018 deaths
Athletes (track and field) at the 1976 Summer Olympics
Athletes (track and field) at the 1980 Summer Olympics
Romanian male discus throwers
Olympic athletes of Romania
Sportspeople from Târgu Mureș